Dacrydium ericoides is a species of conifer in the family Podocarpaceae and is found only in Sarawak, on Borneo. It is threatened by habitat loss.

It is locally common in primary montane rain forest, aka cloud forest or mossy forest, on exposed ridges from 1,000 to 2,200 meters elevation, including Mount Dulit, Bukit Lawi, Bukit Skelap, Gunung Mulu, and Gunung Murud. It appears to be confined to ultrabasic soils.

References

ericoides
Endemic flora of Borneo
Flora of Sarawak
Flora of the Borneo montane rain forests
Taxa named by David John de Laubenfels
Plants described in 1988
Taxonomy articles created by Polbot